End is a 1984 fiction film by Mahmoud Shoolizadeh; is a story about the children who live near the railways and their lives, which are full of ups and downs. The film tells the story of a small child who lives in the south of Tehran during times of social problems. The film analyses an unjust and unfair society.

Director's View 
Inflation, unemployment, divorce and social poverty are the major problems in modern Iran. If the officials, social and cultural experts and planners do not find solutions to these problems, the future society would face crisis due to the consequences.

Technical specifications and Film crew 
16mm, 17mins, Fiction, Iran, 1984
Script writer and Director: Mahmoud Shoolizadeh
Edit: Esfandyar Habibnejad 
Producer: Mahmoud Shoolizadeh (University of TV & Radio, Iran)

Iranian short films
1984 films